Caloptilia hamulifera is a moth of the family Gracillariidae. It is known from China (Sichuan).

References

hamulifera
Moths of Asia
Moths described in 1990